Green's Grant is a township in Coös County, New Hampshire, United States. As of the 2020 census, the grant had a population of zero. The grant lies within the White Mountain National Forest. The base of the Mount Washington Auto Road is located in Green's Grant.

In New Hampshire, locations, grants, townships (which are different from towns), and purchases are unincorporated portions of a county which are not part of any town and have limited self-government (if any, as many are uninhabited).

History 
John Wentworth, British colonial governor of New Hampshire, made the grant to Lieutenant Francis Green of Boston, one of the last land grants that Wentworth made to soldiers of the French and Indian Wars.

Geography 
The Peabody River, a north-flowing tributary of the Androscoggin River, runs through the center of the grant, joined by its tributaries Nineteenmile Brook and Cowboy Brook from the east and the West Branch from the west. New Hampshire Route 16 follows the Peabody River through the grant, leading southward (upstream) to the height of land at Pinkham Notch in neighboring Pinkham's Grant and north to U.S. Route 2 in Gorham.

Demographics 

As of the 2020 census, no people lived in the grant.

References

Townships in Coös County, New Hampshire
Berlin, New Hampshire micropolitan area
Townships in New Hampshire